Christine Wenzel ( Brinker on 10 July 1981 in Ibbenbüren) is a German skeet shooter. A four-time world champion, she started shooting in 2000 and is competing for German club SSC Schale under the guidance of Wilhelm Metelmann.  She won the bronze in the women's skeet at the 2008 Olympic Games.  At the 2012 Games, she again reached the final, finishing in 6th place.

References

External links 
 
 
 

1981 births
Living people
People from Ibbenbüren
Sportspeople from Münster (region)
German female sport shooters
Skeet shooters
World record holders in shooting
Olympic shooters of Germany
Shooters at the 2008 Summer Olympics
Shooters at the 2012 Summer Olympics
Shooters at the 2016 Summer Olympics
Olympic bronze medalists for Germany
Olympic medalists in shooting
Medalists at the 2008 Summer Olympics
European Games competitors for Germany
Shooters at the 2015 European Games
21st-century German women